The 1st Pan American Acrobatic Gymnastics Championships were held in Caguas, Puerto Rico from October 6 to 12, 2015. The competition was organized by the Puerto Rican Gymnastics Federation and approved by the International Gymnastics Federation.

Participating nations

Results

Senior

Age Groups

Medals table

Senior

Age Groups

References

External links
FIG Competition Information
Official website

2015 in gymnastics
Pan American Gymnastics Championships
International gymnastics competitions hosted by Puerto Rico
2015 in Puerto Rican sports